Ian Crossley (born 1951), better known by the stage name Fine Time Fontayne, is an English actor and stage director.

Early life
Fontayne was born in Wombwell, West Riding of Yorkshire (now South Yorkshire) into a mining family. In the 1960s, he moved with his parents and brothers to Sheffield, where they ran a pub. He took his stage name when he began singing and playing at a local folk club in Yorkshire. He had previously called himself Ordinary Seaman Whittle. He started acting in the 1970s with the Crucible Vanguard Company.

Career
In the early years of his career Fontayne worked in cabaret, community and repertory theatre, as well as the Red Ladder Theatre Company. He has played a variety of roles in many long-running British TV series such as All Creatures Great and Small, Coronation Street, Emmerdale as well as both Heartbeat playing the role of a journalist on the Ashfordly Gazette and The Royal in which he appeared as Nobby Jepson, an ex-coal miner turned "back setter," in the episode Consequences.

He is a frequent voice in BBC Radio drama (including The Blackburn Files and Street and Lane) and has appeared in films including 24 Hour Party People and Butterfly Kiss.

Fontayne appeared in the 2002 radio series The Little World of Don Camillo. He directed a successful production of Sleeping Beauty at the Mercury Theatre, Essex in December 2007 and January 2008. In February 2020, Fontayne portrayed the role of Ned Wainwright in the BBC soap opera Doctors.

Fontayne was also a regular feature in Oldham Colliseum's annual pantomime, co-writing and performing as the pantomime dame in things such as Aladdin, Sleeping Beauty and Mother Goose.

References

External links
 

Review of Hamlet with Fine Time Fontayne:
 https://extra.shu.ac.uk/emls/15-3/revham.htm

1951 births
Living people
English male actors
English theatre directors
People from Wombwell